The mixed synchronised 3 metre springboard is part of the 2022 Commonwealth Games diving program. The competition will be held on 8 August 2022 at Sandwell Aquatics Centre in Birmingham, England.

This is the inaugural edition of the event. Nations can send more than one team to a synchronised event. Australia, Malaysia, Scotland and hosts England have entered two teams in this event.

Schedule
All times are BST (UTC+1)

Format
A single round will be held, with each team making five dives. Eleven judges score each dive: three for each diver, and five for synchronisation. Only the middle score counts for each diver, with the middle three counting for synchronisation. These five scores are averaged, multiplied by 3, and multiplied by the dive's degree of difficulty to give a total dive score. The scores for each of the five dives are then aggregated to give a final score.

Field
The initial field for the event was published on 22 July 2022:

References

Diving at the 2022 Commonwealth Games